The Glass Alibi is a 1946 crime drama film noir directed by W. Lee Wilder starring Paul Kelly, Douglas Fowley, Anne Gwynne and Maris Wrixon.

Plot
A reporter marries a dying girl for her money, but she recovers from her illness so he plots her murder.

Cast
 Paul Kelly as Max Anderson
 Douglas Fowley as Joe Eykner
 Anne Gwynne as Belle Martin
 Maris Wrixon as Linda Vale
 Jack Conrad as Benny Brandini
 Selmer Jackson as Dr. John F. Lawson
 Cyril Thornton as Riggs
 Cy Kendall as Red Hogan
 Walter Soderling as Coroner
 Victor Potel as Gas Attendant
 George Chandler as Bartender
 Phyllis Adair as Nurse
 Ted Stanhope as Drug Clerk
 Dick Scott as Frank
 Eula Guy as Connie
 Forrest Taylor as Charlie

References

External links
 
 
 
 
 

1946 films
1940s crime thriller films
American crime thriller films
American black-and-white films
Film noir
Republic Pictures films
Films directed by W. Lee Wilder
1940s English-language films
1940s American films